Kum & Go is a convenience store chain primarily located in the Midwestern United States. The company, started by William A. Krause and Tony S. Gentle, based in Des Moines, Iowa, operates 400 stores in 13 states—primarily in its home state of Iowa. Other states include: Arkansas, Colorado, Michigan, Minnesota, Missouri, Montana, Nebraska, North Dakota, Oklahoma, South Dakota, Utah, and Wyoming. Kum & Go was ranked as the 24th-largest convenience store chain in the United States by Convenience Store News in 2019.

Background
The chain was founded by William A. Krause and Tony S. Gentle, who founded the Hampton Oil Company in Hampton, Iowa, in 1959. Hampton Oil eventually became the Krause Gentle Corporation, and is today a part of Krause Group. In 1963, Krause Gentle introduced the company's first convenience stores, selling both fuel and merchandise items, in which they changed their gas station into a "station store".

The Kum & Go name was adopted in 1975 to unify the company's array of stores under a single brand. It was a play on the phrase "come and go" using the initials of founders Krause and Gentle. Sales of Kum & Go-branded merchandise increased after Johnny Knoxville was seen wearing a Kum & Go T-shirt during a scene in the 2006 movie Jackass Number Two.

Company expansion
In 1988, Krause Gentle moved the company's corporate headquarters to West Des Moines. Kum & Go went through a period of rapid expansion in the late 1990s and early 2000s. In addition to building new stores, Krause Gentle acquired unwanted stores from chains such as 7-Eleven, QuikTrip, and Git 'n' Go and converted them to Kum & Go stores. In 2010 the company announced a major expansion of 100 stores throughout the Midwest and included Kansas for the first time. It was announced in June, 2011, that Kum & Go had reached agreement to sell twenty-two stores, again mostly in smaller rural communities, to rival Casey's General Stores. According to Kum & Go CEO Kyle J. Krause, the sale allowed for reinvestment other stores and helped drive long-term growth.

On June 1, 2018, Kum & Go named fourth-generation family member Tanner Krause as president, with his father, CEO and President Kyle Krause, becoming chairman and CEO.

In 2018, Kum & Go moved its headquarters to the Renzo Piano-designed Krause Gateway Center in downtown Des Moines, Iowa.

In 2019, Kum & Go ranked 178th on Forbes magazine's list of the largest private companies in the United States, ranking second to Hy-Vee among companies based in Iowa.

In addition to Kum & Go, Krause Group owns and operates the Des Moines Menace soccer team as well as Italian Serie B side Parma, Solar Transport, Teamwork Ranch, Dalla Terra Ranch, and Italian wineries Vietti and  Enrico Serafino. 

In 2022, Kum & Go announced the company would be opening 20 to 25 stores in the Boise metropolitan area in the coming years.

Lawsuit

Kum & Go was sued in 2004 by an Omaha man claiming racial discrimination after being denied access to the public restroom.  The lawsuit was rejected by a lower court, and the decision was upheld by the 8th U.S. Circuit Court of Appeals which ruled that the plaintiff had no standing to file the action, among other things.

References

External links

 
  

Convenience stores of the United States
Companies based in Des Moines, Iowa
West Des Moines, Iowa
American companies established in 1959
Retail companies established in 1959
1959 establishments in Iowa
Economy of the Midwestern United States